Larry Kelly (born c. 1935) is an American politician and logistics engineer. He served as the mayor of Daytona Beach, Florida for twelve consecutive terms from 1974 to 1993. He was instrumental with getting MTV to showcase Spring Break in Daytona Beach in 1986–1993, though later lamented it was a mistake because locals experienced many problems during Spring Break every year. He spent his last few years as mayor trying to control Spring Break partiers. Soon after he lost his election bid in 1993, Daytona cut ties with MTV.

Biography 
Larry Kelly Sr., who was born in 1935, is a native of Carbondale, Pennsylvania. Kelly served in the U.S. Air Force.

Kelly was a logistics engineer by profession. In 1963, he and his new wife Joan moved to Daytona Beach while Kelly was employed by General Electric. He retired from General Electric in 1991. Larry Kelly Field was named for him at Daytona Beach Municipal Stadium in 1994. In 200o, he was elected to the board of directors of the Stewart-Marchman Foundation. Kelly was married to Joan Kelly who died on July 31, 2015. He has five children including Volusia County Judge Christopher Kelly.

In 2017, he joined with retired Yonkers, New York police commissioner Albert “Al” McEvoy to solve Daytona Beach cold cases.

Kelly's wife, Jane Kelly, a registered nurse, died on July 31, 2015, at the age of 78. The couple have five children - Larry Kelly Jr., Ann, Patrick, Christopher, and Mathew. Kelly's son, Chris Kelly, was elected a Volusia County court judge in 2012 with 63% of the vote.

Politics 
Kelly was on the Daytona Beach planning board for four years before being elected to the Daytona Beach city commission in 1971. Kelly was the Daytona Beach city commissioner until he was elected mayor in 1974 in  a special election to fill the vacancy in that office.

Kelly served as the Mayor of Daytona Beach, Florida for twelve consecutive, two-year terms from 1974 to 1993.

After Fort Lauderdale started discouraging college students from vacationing there for Spring Break in the mid-1980s, Kelly appeared on national television to encourage college vacationers to come to Daytona Beach for Spring Break instead. Soon after, beer and cigarette brands started advertising in Daytona Beach for Spring Break. MTV's Spring Break showcase moved their Spring Break coverage to Daytona Beach in 1986. He later called that decision a mistake as locals experienced many problems during Spring Break every year. Kelly's efforts to rein in the revelry included promoting athletic competitions called "Spring Games" to channel youthful energy in a wholesome direction, and proposing that hotels be billed for the cost of sending police to respond to calls during spring break.

In 1993, Kelly was lost his bid for re-election to a potential 13th term in a major upset. Kelly was defeated by restaurateur Paul Carpenella by only 210 votes. Carpenella received 3,689 votes (50.3%), to win the mayoral election, while Kelly placed second, garnering 3,479 votes (47.4%). Turnout in the 1993 municipal election was just 25%. That year, Daytona Beach officials cut their Spring Break marketing budget and ties with MTV.

References

Living people
Date of birth missing (living people)
Mayors of Daytona Beach, Florida
Engineers from Pennsylvania
Florida city council members
People from Carbondale, Pennsylvania
United States Air Force airmen
1935 births